Fatma İpek Bilgin (born 24 March 1956) is a Turkish actress, theatre director and translator. Aside from her career on stage, Bilgin has appeared in various movies and TV series. She has worked for the Ankara State Theatre and first became noticed in 2000s with her roles on television. Her daughter, Çağ Çalışkur, is also an actress.

Bilgin has also translated works by Eric Morris and Joan Hotchkis from English to Turkish. In 2000, she was awarded together with Aylin Damcıoğlu as the Best Actress at the 48th Art Institution Theatre Awards.

Filmography

References

External links 
 

1956 births
Actresses from Istanbul
Turkish stage actresses
Turkish television actresses
Turkish film actresses
Living people